Armed Forces Headquarters Civil Services (AFHQCS) is a  Group A   Central Civil Services with induction at Group B grade, responsible for policy formulation, implementation and providing  administrative support through civilian officers and staff to the Tri-services headquarters of Indian Armed Forces and Inter-Services Organizations (ISOs) such as DRDO, DGQA, DGAQA, DGNCC etc under the Ministry of Defence (MOD). The cadre was established in 1968.  The number of employees in the service in 1968 was 1778; in 2011, 2644; and in 2016, 3235.

Background   
In 1942, during World War II, civilian employees under different departments and branches of the Armed Forces Headquarters responsible for providing static ancillary services were reorganized and consolidated under one head which was called the Chief Administrative Officer (CAO). The first CAO took over on 1 August 1942. In 1987, the post of Chief Administrative Officer (CAO), was upgraded to the level of a Joint Secretary (JS).

Command and control
AFHQCS being an integral and specialist Service of Ministry of Defence (India) reports to Hon'ble Minister of Defence (India) through Defence Secretary/JS & CAO. The Defence Secretary is the Cadre Controlling Authority of AFHQCS.

Upgrading of posts 
The AFHQCS pay grades have been revised upwards following the 4th, 5th, 6th, and 7th Central Pay Commissions: in 1968, it had four grades, 204 were in Group A, and 1472 in Group B. The highest grade was senior civil staff officer, a level analogous to deputy secretary. After the 4th Central Pay Commission (1986), and Sixth Central Pay Commission(2006)a large number of existing posts were upgraded. By 2011 Group A level posts had doubled to 409 including 4 at Joint secretary level, and 2235 at Group B level. Following the 7 CPC, in July 2013, a committee was constituted to carry out further cadre restructuring/review of AFHQ Civil Service to enhance the career prospects of the AFHQ-Civil Service. It currently has six grades/levels, from Assistant Section Officer to Principal Director.

Grades and levels 
There are three levels of inductions into the AFHQ service wherein there is a direct entry(DR) through prestigious Civil Services Examination (CSE) conducted by Union Public Service Commission as Section Officer ( Group -B Gazetted), then direct recruitment at ASO level through  SSC ( Combined Graduate level) and by promotion from upper division clerk (UDC) (Clerical Cadre)  in ASO. The evolution of the service, its hierarchical structure, pay grades, and levels, are tabulated below:

Strength 
The authorized strength of the service is 2644 (2011), an increase of 866, from a total of 1778 in 1968. This is in addition to Armed Forces Headquarters Stenographers Service, which has an overall strength of 856 (8 Senior Principal Private Secretary; 44 Principal Private Secretaries; 300 Private Secretary; and 504 Personal Assistants). The increase in strength of the service is tabulated below:

Time Line

1 August 1942 
In response to the demands of the World War II civilian employees in the War Department in Delhi are consolidated under the Office of Chief Administrative Officer (CAO). The first four CAO were brigadiers of the Indian Army.

1 March 1968 
Armed Forces Headquarters Civil Service constituted as group B Service from the existing staff under the Armed Forces headquarters and inter service organisations. The highest grade in the AFHQ Civil Service is Senior Staff Officer, analogous to a deputy secretary, with pay grade of Lt colonel.

1987 
The post of CAO is upgraded to Joint Secretary.

2001 
The Armed Forces Headquarters Civil Service Rules, 2001, superseeded Armed Forces Headquarters Civil Service Rules, 1968. Two Existing posts upgraded to JS, and Nine to Director.

31 October 2002 
AFHQCS adopts new designations of Principal Director (Senior Administrative Grade); Joint Director (Senior Civilian Staff officer), analogous to Civil Service time scale post with 9 years of service; Deputy Director (deputy director), analogous to civil service time scale post with 4 years of service; and Section Officer (Assistant Civilian Section Officer) .

15 April 2011 
Principal Director posts increased from 1 to 3: one each in the Military Secretary's branch, Adjutant General's branch, and Directorate general of Quality assurance. 20 existing post upgraded to Director post, a post analogous to civil service time scale post with 13 years

2017 
Principal Director posts increased from 4 to 11 and Directors posts from 21 to 36. All promotions are based on vacancies at higher grade. All Directors in the service are empanelled to be Principal Directors. The present strength of AFHQ CS is 3235.

See also 
 Pay commission
 Sixth Central Pay Commission
 7th Central Pay Commission (CPC) and Defence Forces

References

External links 
 Chief Administrative Officer
 Report of Seventh Central Pay Commission Department of Expenditure, Ministry of Finance
 Gazette-Notification, 25 July 2016 Department of Expenditure, Ministry of Finance
 Report of the Sixth Central Pay Commission Ministry of Finance
 7 CPC Notification for defence-personnel, Officers, 7 September 2016 Ministry of Defence

Military history of India
Ministry of Defence (India)
Civil Services of India